Razumov a surname and can refer to:

Razumov (crater), a lunar crater
Aleksandr Razumov (born 1980), Russian professional footballer
Maksim Razumaw, (born 1977), Belarusian professional footballer
Alternating sign matrix, a mathematical model related to the Razumov–Stroganov conjecture
Razumov (film), a 1936 French film